Lene Mykjåland (born 20 February 1987) is a Norwegian footballer who played for LSK Kvinner and the Norway women's national team, having made her debut for the senior team on 7 March 2007, in a 1–2 loss against Germany.

Career
Mykjåland started her career in Randesund IL, a district club in Kristiansand. In 2003, Mykjåland played with Amazon Grimstad and played there until she went on to Røa in September 2005. Mykjåland was Røa's top scorer in 2007 with 11 goals.

Mykjåland quickly became one of the league's top talents, and has also managed to establish herself on the Norwegian National senior squad, having been called up to both the 2007 Women's World Cup as well as the 2008 Summer Olympics held in Beijing, China.

On 21 October 2008 Mykjåland and four other Røa players – Marie Knutsen, Guro Knutsen, Marit Fiane Christensen and Siri Nordby – made headlines when they announced in a press release that they would not be returning to the national team due to issues the five had with the national team leadership. While the press statement never mentioned coach Bjarne Berntsen's name, it was assumed that he was instrumental in their decision to retire from the team. The retirement, which came off in many newspapers as a boycott, created widespread media attention. When Eli Landsem took over the national team after the 2009 European Championship, they ended their boycott and made themselves available again for the national team. On 15 January 2010, Mykjåland played her first game for Norway since the boycott in a 1–1 draw against England. In 2011, Mykjåland was included in the squad that was going to play in the 2011 Women's World Cup.

The Washington Freedom of Women's Professional Soccer announced on 23 December 2009, that they had signed Mykjåland, and she joined the team on 1 April 2010. After one season in America, she returned to Norway and signed a two-year contract with former team Røa.

Career statistics
Statistics accurate as of match played 30 October 2016

International goals

Honours

Club
Røa
 Toppserien: 2007, 2008, 2009
 Norwegian Cup: 2006, 2008

LSK Kvinner
 Toppserien: 2014, 2015
 Norwegian Cup: 2014, 2015

Individual
 Top Scorer, Toppserien: 2009 (20 goals)

References

External links
 
 Røa player profile
 soccerway.com

1987 births
Living people
Norwegian women's footballers
Norwegian Christians
Norway women's international footballers
Footballers at the 2008 Summer Olympics
Olympic footballers of Norway
Sportspeople from Kristiansand
Expatriate women's soccer players in the United States
Norwegian expatriate women's footballers
Norwegian expatriate sportspeople in the United States
Røa IL players
LSK Kvinner FK players
2011 FIFA Women's World Cup players
2015 FIFA Women's World Cup players
Women's association football midfielders
Women's association football forwards
2007 FIFA Women's World Cup players
Women's Professional Soccer players